Arisaema candidissimum is a species of flowering plant in the arum family (Araceae), originating in western China (Tibet, Sichuan, Yunnan). Various English names have been given to the species, including Chinese cobra lily and Chinese jack-in-the-pulpit.

Description
It is usually described as growing from tubers, although the AGS Encyclopaedia of Alpines says that most Arisaema species grow from corms "often  described wrongly as tubers". It does not appear above the ground until late spring or early summer (typically June in the British Isles). The inflorescence is produced before the leaves open fully and is of the usual aroid shape. The small flowers are at the base of a thin spadix which is surrounded by a hood-like spathe. It varies in colour, typically being white, often pinkish or greenish white or cream, with stripes which are green on the outside and pink on the inside.

The specific epithet candidissimum means "shining white".

Cultivation
Brian Mathew considers it by far the best species of Arisaema for British gardens and recommends growing it in a warm, sunny place, although it should not be too dry in summer. A list produced for the International Aroid Society says it is hardy to −20 °F (−30 °C), USDA Zone 4b. Two clones were originally introduced into cultivation by Forrest, one pale pink, the other pure white. Forms introduced later by Chinese suppliers include plants with darker, reddish-pink stripes.

This plant has gained the Royal Horticultural Society's Award of Garden Merit.

References

External links

 Pacific Bulb Society

candidissimum
Endemic flora of China
Plants described in 1917